Midland is an unincorporated community in Klamath County, Oregon, United States, about  south of Klamath Falls on U.S. Route 97. The site was platted in 1908 and named Midland, with a post office established in 1909. At the time it was said the name was chosen because the town was halfway between Portland and San Francisco on the proposed Cascade Line of the Southern Pacific Railroad. It is not halfway, however, and it is now thought that the name refers to the town's site on land partly surrounded by marshes.

When the Cascade Line reached Midland, the community served as a depot and shipping point for cattle and other livestock, and it once had two general stores, a hotel with a saloon, a livery stable, a warehouse for grain and a telephone office. Little remains in Midland today, but Klamath County's visitor center is located there.

Climate
This region experiences warm (but not hot) and dry summers, with no average monthly temperatures above . According to the Köppen Climate Classification system, Midland has a warm-summer Mediterranean climate, abbreviated "Csb" on climate maps.

Notable residents

Carl Barks, Disney Studios illustrator

References

Unincorporated communities in Klamath County, Oregon
1908 establishments in Oregon
Populated places established in 1908
Unincorporated communities in Oregon